Jan Pieter "Jan Peter" Balkenende Jr. (born 7 May 1956) is a Dutch politician of the Christian Democratic Appeal (CDA) party and jurist who served as Prime Minister of the Netherlands from 22 July 2002 to 14 October 2010.

Balkenende studied History and Law at the Free University Amsterdam obtaining Master of Arts and law degrees and worked as a legal counsel for the academic council of his alma mater before finishing his thesis and graduated as a PhD in governmental studies and worked as a professor of Christian theology at his alma mater from April 1993 until May 2002. After the election of 1998 Balkenende was elected as a Member of the House of Representatives on 19 May 1998 and served as a frontbencher and spokesperson for Finances and as deputy parliamentary leader. After Party Leader and Parliamentary leader Jaap de Hoop Scheffer stepped down before an upcoming election Balkenende announced his candidacy and was selected as his successor on 1 October 2001. For the election of 2002 Balkenende served as Lijsttrekker (top candidate) and after a cabinet formation with the Pim Fortuyn List and the People's Party for Freedom and Democracy formed the Cabinet Balkenende I and became Prime Minister of the Netherlands taking office 22 July 2002.

The cabinet Balkenende I fell just 87 days into its term. For the election of 2003 Balkenende again served as Lijsttrekker and following a cabinet formation with the People's Party for Freedom and Democracy and Democrats 66 they formed the Cabinet Balkenende II and continued as Prime Minister. This second cabinet fell on 30 June 2006 was replaced with the caretaker Cabinet Balkenende III on 7 July 2006. For the election of 2006 Balkenende once again served as Lijsttrekker and following a cabinet formation with Labour Leader Wouter Bos and fellow Christian-democrats formed the Cabinet Balkenende IV and continued as Prime Minister for another term. This fourth cabinet fell exactly 3 years into its term. For the election of 2010 Balkenende once again served as Lijsttrekker but suffered a large defeat and announced his retirement and stepped down as Leader on 9 June 2010. Balkenende left office following the installation of the Cabinet Rutte I on 14 October 2010.

Balkenende retired from active politics at 54 and became active in the private sector as a corporate director and also works as a professor of Governance, Institutions and Internationalization at the Erasmus University Rotterdam since December 2010. During his premiership, his cabinets were responsible for several major reforms to the education system, immigration laws and reducing the deficit following the financial crisis of 2008. He is the fourth longest-serving Prime Minister after World War II and his premiership is consistently regarded both by scholars and the public to have been above average. Balkenende was granted the honorary title of Minister of State on 14 October 2022 exactly twelve years after leaving office

Early life
Jan Pieter Balkenende Jr. was born on 7 May 1956 in Biezelinge in the province of Zeeland in a family belonging to the Reformed faith, the son of Jan Pieter Balkenende Sr. a cereal grains merchant and Thona Johanna Sandee, a teacher.

During his childhood, Balkenende was an active supporter of the Dutch football team PSV Eindhoven, along with his father he frequented many matches. He also regularly visited the local music school and theatre. Balkenende went to a Reformed Protestant primary school in Kapelle. He attended secondary school at the "Christian Lyceum for Zeeland" in Goes, graduating in 1974.

He studied at the Vrije Universiteit Amsterdam where he received an MA degree in history in 1980, subsequently an LLM degree in Dutch law in 1982, and finally a PhD in law in 1992.

Balkenende resides with his wife, Bianca Hoogendijk, and his daughter, Amelie, in Capelle aan den IJssel. During his tenure as Prime Minister, he did not use the Catshuis, the formal residency of the Prime Minister.

Early political career

He began his career on the staff of the research institute of the CDA and as a city councilman in Amstelveen. 
As a councilman, he proposed the Krokettenmotie which gave council members the right to a croquette if the council went past 23:00 and it was passed. 
In 1992 he received his PhD with a thesis on "Governance regulation and social organisations" (Overheidsregelgeving en maatschappelijke organisaties), which was strongly inspired by the Communitarian ideas of Amitai Etzioni. One year later in 1993, he became an extraordinary professor of Christian-Social Thought at the Free University of Amsterdam.

Balkenende first entered the House of Representatives on 19 May 1998 while the CDA was in opposition. He became the CDA's financial spokesman and was also involved with social affairs, justice, and domestic affairs. In this role he advocated a substantial reduction of the national debt and sound public finances.

He was elected Chairman of the CDA parliamentary fraction on 1 October 2001, succeeding Jaap de Hoop Scheffer. On 3 November 2001, he was appointed lijsttrekker for the CDA in the tumultuous May 2002 parliamentary elections. These elections restored the CDA's former position as the largest political party in the House of Representatives.

Prime Minister of the Netherlands

First cabinet

On 4 July 2002 Queen Beatrix asked Balkenende to form a new government after the general elections following the resignation of Prime Minister Wim Kok. The coalition cabinet included the Pim Fortuyn List (LPF) party, whose leader (Pim Fortuyn) was assassinated just days before the election. It collapsed after just 87 days in office because of internal conflicts within the LPF that destabilised the government.

Second cabinet

After early elections in 2003 Balkenende formed his second government with the Christian Democratic Appeal (CDA), the liberal People's Party for Freedom and Democracy (VVD) and the progressive liberal D66. Once again leader of a centre-right coalition, Balkenende's policies centred on reform of the Dutch public services, social security, pre-pension facilities, public health, reducing crime, a tough immigration policy and historically large cuts in public spending. The measures gave rise to large public anger and bad results in opinion polls for his CDA party. While his party remained the largest Dutch delegation in the European Parliament after the European elections, beating the general expectation of a huge loss in parliamentary seats, the party suffered strong losses during Dutch municipal elections of 2006, losing their position as the largest party in many municipalities. Despite his unpopularity among Dutch voters (polls in 2006 showed that only 26–33% of the voters had confidence in him as prime minister), his position as leader of the CDA remained stable. In the beginning of 2006, some CDA members tried to replace Balkenende as leader with Agriculture Minister Cees Veerman. Veerman did not accept the proposition and offered his support to Balkenende. Balkenende's popularity recovered since then, surpassing that of his main competitor Wouter Bos in the autumn of 2006. By then, 53% preferred Balkenende as Prime Minister of the Netherlands while 40% preferred Bos. The switch in public opinion is sometimes explained by the steady recovery of the Dutch economy during the last year of his administration and the positive effects of the reformed policy of the Balkenende cabinet, combined with declining confidence in Bos as a good alternative for the position of Prime Minister.

On 1 July 2004 Balkenende took up the rotating presidency of the European Union.

Third cabinet

On 30 June 2006, the Democrats 66, the smallest coalition party, withdrew its support of the government over the way Immigration Minister Rita Verdonk had handled the crisis around the naturalisation of Ayaan Hirsi Ali, a member of the House of Representatives. Balkenende resigned for the second time as Prime Minister of the Netherlands, announced early elections and presented his third government a week later. This rump cabinet, formed of a minority coalition of CDA and VVD, stayed in office until the elections of 22 November 2006.

Fourth cabinet

Though his old coalition partners VVD and D66 fared badly in the parliamentary elections of 2006, Balkenende managed to defend the dominant position of his CDA. Needing alternative coalition partners to form a new majority government, he formed a social-Christian coalition with the Labour Party (PvdA) and the orthodox-Protestant Christian Union. The Fourth Balkenende cabinet was formed after Balkenende was appointed formateur by Queen Beatrix on 9 February 2007. His cabinet was announced on 13 February and was scheduled to be in office until 2011, but it fell in the early morning of 20 February 2010 as the result of disagreement between the majority of the parliament and the coalition partners CDA and PvdA over the extension of the Dutch ISAF-mission in Afghanistan. In contrast to the formation of a new caretaker cabinet with full responsibility (Balkenende III after the fall of Balkenende II), Balkenende IV continued as a demissionary cabinet, a caretaker cabinet with limited responsibility.

2010 election and resignation
Despite serious criticism by former prime ministers from the CDA, Balkenende was the Christian Democratic Appeal lijsttrekker for the Dutch general election of 2010.
Balkenende raised mild controversy during his campaign for the 2010 Dutch elections. While appearing in a television show, Balkenende was asked by a female presenter what parties he would most likely form a coalition with. Balkenende first gave evasive answers, then when asked again by the presenter, responded saying "U kijkt zo lief" (English: "You look so cute"). The comment was regarded as sexist and criticised by several people, including Opzij chief-editor Margriet van der Linden and GroenLinks leader Femke Halsema (who stated that "[the prime minister] deserves a knee to the groin" (in Dutch: "een knietje verdient")). Balkenende apologised for the comment later.

On 9 June 2010, Balkenende resigned his position as leader of the CDA as well as his seat in the newly elected parliament, taking political responsibility for the CDA's disappointing election results in the 2010 general election.

Other issues
In 2004, during his second cabinet, Balkenende was diagnosed with necrotising fasciitis. He was treated through surgical debridement and made a full recovery after several weeks in hospital.

On 4 June 2005, the Belgian Minister of Foreign Affairs Karel De Gucht said in the Flemish newspaper Het Laatste Nieuws (The Latest News) that "Balkenende is a mix of Harry Potter and a petty rigid bourgeois mentality". This comparison caused a small diplomatic controversy, and the Belgian ambassador had to apologise to Ben Bot, the Dutch Minister of Foreign Affairs. Retired deputy prime minister Hans Wiegel commented he preferred Harry Potter to the Manneken Pis.

Balkenende has a close relationship with the Dutch people from Suriname and the Netherlands Antilles. He has visited several Keti Koti celebrations in recent years.

Balkenende's nicknames were "JP", "Bak ellende" (bin of misery) and "Harry Potter", among others.

He was a member of the Reformed Churches in the Netherlands and since 1 May 2004 a member of the Protestant Church in the Netherlands.

Honours and decorations

Awards
Golden Honorary Medal, of the municipality Amstelveen (Netherlands, 30 May 1998)

Honorary degrees
Honorary doctorate in laws, Hope College (Holland, Michigan, United States, 7 September 2012)
Honorary doctorate in human letters, Hofstra University (Hempstead, New York, United States, 22 May 2011)
Honorary doctorate in sociology, Yonsei University (Seoul, South Korea, 27 April 2010)
Honorary doctorate in systems, design and management, Keio University (Tokyo, Japan, 27 oktober 2009)
Honorary doctorate in theology, Károli Gáspár University of the Hungarian Reformed Church (Budapest, Hungary, 10 October 2005)

References

External links

  Prof.Mr.Dr. J.P. (Jan Peter) Balkenende Parlement & Politiek
  Kabinet Balkenende I Rijksoverheid
  Kabinet-Balkenende II Rijksoverheid
  Kabinet-Balkenende III Rijksoverheid
  Kabinet-Balkenende IV Rijksoverheid

|-

|-

|-

|-

|-

1956 births
Living people
Christian Democratic Appeal politicians
Commanders Grand Cross of the Order of the Polar Star
Dutch biblical scholars
Dutch Calvinist and Reformed theologians
Dutch corporate directors
Dutch management consultants
Dutch public administration scholars
Academic staff of Erasmus University Rotterdam
Ernst & Young people
Governmental studies academics
Grand Cordons of the Order of Independence (Jordan)
Grand Crosses of the Order of Merit of the Grand Duchy of Luxembourg
Grand Crosses of the Order of Merit of the Republic of Poland
Grand Crosses with Star and Sash of the Order of Merit of the Federal Republic of Germany
International relations scholars
Knights Grand Cross of the Order of Orange-Nassau
Leaders of the Christian Democratic Appeal
Members of the House of Representatives (Netherlands)
Ministers of General Affairs of the Netherlands
Ministers of State (Netherlands)
Municipal councillors of Amstelveen
People from Capelle aan den IJssel
People from Kapelle
Presidents of the European Council
Prime Ministers of the Netherlands
Protestant Church Christians from the Netherlands
Recipients of the Order of the Star of Ghana
Reformed Churches Christians from the Netherlands
Vrije Universiteit Amsterdam alumni
Academic staff of Vrije Universiteit Amsterdam
20th-century Dutch educators
20th-century Dutch jurists
20th-century Dutch politicians
20th-century Dutch scientists
21st-century Dutch businesspeople
21st-century Dutch educators
21st-century Dutch jurists
21st-century Dutch politicians
21st-century Dutch scientists